Lance Wilder is an American animator and longtime background designer on The Simpsons, joining during the show's second season and having done work on roughly 600 episodes. He also served as background design supervisor from 1993 to 2003 and worked as the background design lead on The Simpsons Movie.  His other credits as a background designer include The Critic, Mission Hill, King of the Hill, Duckman, and Rugrats.

Biography
Wilder was born in Lowell, Massachusetts and raised in the nearby town of Chelmsford and graduated from Chelmsford High School in 1986. Various landmarks from the area where he grew up were later incorporated into his design work on The Simpsons, such as the Springfield Town Hall, which directly takes its design from the Chelmsford Public Library.

He is an alumnus of the Rhode Island School of Design. After graduating in 1990, he moved to Los Angeles and was hired as a background designer for The Simpsons immediately despite no previous experience in animation, with his first assignment being "The Raven" segment of the original "Treehouse of Horror" episode. Wilder was responsible for the infamous "Squirrel House" design from "Treehouse of Horror V", which took him several days to draw only to be cut from the final episode. He was also featured in the 2000 BBC documentary The Simpsons: America's First Family. He received an Annie Award nomination in 2013.

Filmography

References

External links 
 

Living people
Chelmsford High School alumni
Rhode Island School of Design alumni
1968 births
People from Lowell, Massachusetts
People from Chelmsford, Massachusetts